Ivan Matveyevich Kapitanets (Russian: Ива́н Матве́евич Капита́нец; 10 January 1928 – 25 September 2018) was a Russian Fleet Admiral who served in the Soviet Navy.

Kapitanets entered the Navy in 1946 and graduated from the Caspian Higher Naval School in 1950. After graduation he joined the Northern Fleet and served as torpedo officer on the destroyer Okrylenny.

After completing the Naval Academy in 1961 he commanded a destroyer squadron of the Northern Fleet. Kapitanets graduated from the General Staff Academy in 1970 and was deputy commander of the 5th Operational Squadron (the Soviet Mediterranean squadron) between 1970 and 1973. 

In 1973 Kapitanets was assigned to the Pacific Fleet and commanded the Kamchatka Flotilla. He was promoted to vice admiral in 1975. 

Kapitanets was deputy commander of the Baltic Fleet in 1978 and commanded this fleet in 1981-85 when he was promoted to commander of the Northern Fleet.  Kapitanets was made first deputy commander of the Soviet Navy and Fleet Admiral in 1988. He retired in 1992.

In retirement Kapitanets consulted for the Russian Government on naval matters and was a member of the Academy of Military Sciences. He was also the author of several books on Russian naval history.

Honours and awards
 Order of Courage
 Order of Lenin
 Order of Nakhimov, 1st class
 Order of the Red Star
 Order for Service to the Homeland in the Armed Forces of the USSR, 3rd class

References

page in Russian
page in Russian

1928 births
2018 deaths
People from Rostov Oblast
Russian military leaders
Soviet admirals
Soviet Navy personnel
Recipients of the Order of Lenin
Recipients of the Order of Courage
Recipients of the Order of Nakhimov, 1st class
N. G. Kuznetsov Naval Academy alumni
Military Academy of the General Staff of the Armed Forces of the Soviet Union alumni